KGIL is a class A radio station broadcasting a country music format to Johannesburg, California.

History
KGIL began broadcasting on April 11, 2011.

References

External links
 

Mass media in Kern County, California
Country radio stations in the United States
GIL (FM)
Radio stations established in 2013
2013 establishments in California